The Colville Range is a small mountain range in southwestern British Columbia, Canada, located on the north side of Mackenzie Sound and north of Broughton Island. It has an area of 20 km2 and is a subrange of the Pacific Ranges which in turn form part of the Coast Mountains.

See also
List of mountain ranges

References

Pacific Ranges
Central Coast of British Columbia